Connor Mark Simpson (born 24 January 2000) is an English professional footballer who plays as a forward for Northern Premier League club Whitby Town.

Playing career
Simpson made his senior debut for Hartlepool as a substitute for Lewis Hawkins in a 1–0 defeat to Cheltenham Town on 29 April 2017. On 2 September 2017, Simpson scored his first goal for Hartlepool on his first senior start for the club in a 3–1 win over Maidstone United. The goal meant that he was the first player born in the 21st century to have scored for Hartlepool United.

Simpson left Hartlepool to join Championship side Preston North End in January 2018 for a fee of £50,000. Simpson made his Preston debut in January 2018 coming on as a late substitute against Aston Villa.

Simpson joined Northern Premier League club Hyde United on a short-term loan deal in October 2018 and scored in his second appearance for the club against South Shields. After scoring five goals in nine games for Hyde, Simpson's loan deal was extended until January 2019.

Simpson then joined League Two side Carlisle United on loan until the end of the 2018–19 season. He played eight times for the club, scoring once.

On 2 September 2019, Simpson joined League One side Accrington Stanley on a season-long loan deal. He scored once for Accrington in an EFL Trophy win against Liverpool U23s.

Simpson was released by Preston at the end of 2019–20 season and ended up signing for League of Ireland side Cork City. He left Cork three months later and signed for Scarborough Athletic in October 2020. In February 2021, Simpson went on trial with Norwich City. Due to Scarborough's season being cancelled due to the COVID-19 outbreak, he failed to play to a single game for the non-league club and signed for Icelandic side Kórdrengir in April 2021.

In January 2022, he moved to Cymru Premier side Connah's Quay Nomads. On 6 February 2022, Simpson scored in a penalty shootout win in the Welsh League Cup final.

On 8 July 2022, Simpson moved back to North–East England when he signed for Northern Premier League club Marske United. On 24 November 2022, he signed for fellow Northern Premier League club Whitby Town for an undisclosed fee.

Career statistics

References

2000 births
Living people
People from Guisborough
Footballers from North Yorkshire
English footballers
Association football forwards
Preston North End F.C. players
Hartlepool United F.C. players
Lancaster City F.C. players
Hyde United F.C. players
Carlisle United F.C. players
Cork City F.C. players
Kórdrengir players
Scarborough Athletic F.C. players
Connah's Quay Nomads F.C. players
Marske United F.C. players
Whitby Town F.C. players
English Football League players
Northern Premier League players
League of Ireland players
English expatriate footballers
Expatriate footballers in Iceland
English expatriate sportspeople in Iceland
Expatriate association footballers in the Republic of Ireland